Dawson Tucker Hodgson (born July 10, 1978) is an American politician and a Republican member of the Rhode Island Senate who represented the 35th district from January 4, 2011 until January 6, 2015. In 2014 he made an unsuccessful bid for Attorney General of Rhode Island.

Education
Hodgson graduated from St. Georges School in Newport Rhode Island and continued his education at  Bucknell University and earned his JD from the University of Connecticut School of Law.

Elections
2010: When District 35 Democratic Senator J. Michael Lenihan retired and left the seat open, Hodgson was unopposed for the September 23, 2010 Republican Primary, winning with 971 votes, and won the November 2, 2010 General election with 6,006 votes (54.2%) against Democratic nominee Mark Schwager.
2012: Hodgson was unopposed for the September 11, 2012 Republican Primary, winning with 1,097 votes, and won the November 6, 2012 General election with 7,886 votes (58.3%) against Democratic nominee Winters Hames.
2016: Hodgson resigned as a delegate to that year's 2016 Republican National Convention in order to support Libertarian Gary Johnson for president, instead of the presumptive Republican nominee, Donald Trump.

References

External links
Official page at the Rhode Island General Assembly
Campaign site

Dawson Hodgson at Ballotpedia
Dawson Hodgson at OpenSecrets

|-

Place of birth missing (living people)
1978 births
Living people
Bucknell University alumni
People from North Kingstown, Rhode Island
Rhode Island lawyers
Republican Party Rhode Island state senators
University of Connecticut School of Law alumni
21st-century American politicians